A Business Affair is a 1994 romantic comedy film directed by Charlotte Brandström and starring Carole Bouquet. Christopher Walken and Jonathan Pryce. The film was produced by the United Kingdom in coordination with France, Germany and Spain and much of the film was shot in London. On one film poster of the film, Caroline Bouqet is featured with her arms wrapped around Big Ben with the two men beside her.

Plot 
The film centers on the life of Kate Swallow, and her susceptibility for falling in love with different men. At the beginning of the film, she is in love with a famous writer named Alec Bolton, who dismisses any intentions she has of writing a novel herself as nonsense, strongly discouraging her. Later, she falls in love with a man named Vanni Cors, the publisher of the firm for which Alec writes books, and she leaves Alec for Vanni. Kate later finds out that Vanni also does not think highly of her writing abilities, yet he had strung her along. Gradually, both men change their attitudes as they vainly struggle to win her affections.

Walken has a scene where he is able to perform his trademark tango routine.

Cast 
 Carole Bouquet as  Kate Swallow
 Jonathan Pryce as Alec Bolton
 Christopher Walken as  Vanni Corso
 Sheila Hancock as  Judith
 Anna Manahan as  Bianca
 Fernando Guillén Cuervo as Ángel
 Tom Wilkinson as  Bob
 Marisa Benlloch as  Carmen
 Roger Brierley as Barrister
 Jessica Hamilton as Vanni Corso's secretary
 Paul Bentall as  Drunken Man
 Allan Corduner as  Dinner Guest
 Marian McLoughlin as Dinner Guest
 Miguel De Ángel as  Spanish Taxi Driver
 Christopher Driscoll as  Policeman
 Beth Goddard as Student
 Fergus O'Donnell as Student
 Richard Hampton as  Doctor
 Togo Igawa as a Japanese Golfer
 Rodolfo Recrio as himself

Release 
The film premiered in France on 16 March 1994, later screening in Germany on 5 May 1994 and Spain on 22 July 1994. It premiered in the United States in New York City on 3 November 1995.

The UK version ran for 102 minutes, but the US version has several scenes censored, particularly some of the scenes with nudity, and ran for 98 minutes.

References

External links 
 
 

1994 films
British romantic comedy films
French romantic comedy films
English-language French films
1994 romantic comedy films
1990s English-language films
1990s British films
1990s French films